is a private junior college in Naka-ku, Okayama, Japan. It has been attached to Shujitsu University since 1979.

External links
 

Japanese junior colleges
Universities and colleges in Okayama Prefecture